The 32nd annual Venice International Film Festival was held from 25 August to 6 September 1971. There was no jury because from 1969 to 1979 the festival was not competitive.

Films premiered
 The Devils by Ken Russell (United Kingdom)
 La vacanza by Tinto Brass (Italy)
 The Guest by Liliana Cavani (Italy)
 The Last Movie by Dennis Hopper (USA)
 The Cow by Dariush Mehrjui (Iran)

Awards
Career Golden Lion:
John Ford, Marcel Carné and Ingmar Bergman. 
FIPRESCI Prize
The Cow (Dariush Mehrjui)
Pasinetti Award
Best Foreign Film - The Devils (Ken Russell)
Best Italian Film - La vacanza (Tinto Brass)
CIDALC Award
The Last Movie (Dennis Hopper)
Golden Rudder
The Guest (Liliana Cavani)

References

External links
 
 Venice Film Festival 1971 Awards on IMDb

Venice International Film Festival
Venice International Film Festival
Venice Film Festival
Film
Venice International Film Festival
Venice International Film Festival